Joyance Meechai (born February 2, 1979) is an American curler.

At the national level, she is a 2014 United States mixed doubles curling champion.

Teams and events

Women's

Mixed team

Mixed doubles

Personal life
She started curling in 1999 at the age of 20.

References

External links

 
 Video: 

1979 births
Living people
Sportspeople from New York City
American female curlers
American curling champions
21st-century American women